Beaumont Street is a street in the City of Westminster, London, that runs from Marylebone High Street in the north to the junction of Westmoreland Street and Weymouth Street in the south. The street is crossed midway by Devonshire Street and Clarkes Mews adjoins Beaumont Street on its eastern side at the southern end.

Inhabitants

The historian John Richard Green lived at No. 4 The Macdonald sisters lived at No. 17 in the middle of the nineteenth century. Walter Savage Landor lived at No. 38 in 1794 after being expelled from Oxford University for firing a pistol at the window of a Tory at the university.

Buildings
Beaumont Street is the home of the King Edward VII Hospital and for a time, the Marylebone Library.

Further reading 
 Fourteen trees were planted along Beaumont Street in 2013
 Beaumont Street Chapter from the Survey of London The Bartlett School of Architecture
King Edward VII Hospital, London
Westminster City Council Conservation Audit for Beaumont Street

References 

Streets in the City of Westminster
Marylebone